Oh Romeo was a Hi-NRG concept group created by the Hi-NRG mogul Bobby "O" Orlando in 1982.

Composition
Besides Bobby Orlando, who figured in all releases of the group, there were different session singers and models used for each release.

Throughout its existence, Oh Romeo was managed by Joseph Lodato and Lee Borden, who worked in labels associated with Bobby Orlando.

Lyrics 

Bobby Orlando was responsible for writing the lyrics of the group. While some of the lyrics were published under his name, others were published under the Orlando pseudonym "C. Shore". C. Chase (Clifton "Jiggs" Chase) cowrote "Saving Myself for the One that I Love" with Bobby Orlando.

Reception
During its active years, Oh Romeo toured the US and Latin America, enjoying significant popularity in Latin America, specially in Chile and Mexico.

During the same period, Orlando created other projects, such as The Beat Box Boys, Hotline, Banana Republic, The New York Models, Hippies with Haircuts, SpoogeBoy, Girly, Barbie & the Kens and other projects.

Discography 

The song "One More Shot" was also featured on the 1994 Avex Trax album Super Eurobeat Presents Hi-NRG '80s.
In 1991 the Hot Productions label released their greatest hits album, These Memories: The Best of Oh Romeo.

References

External links
Oh Romeo on DiscoGS

American dance girl groups
American dance music groups
American hi-NRG groups